San Fernando is a census-designated place (CDP) in Starr County, Texas, United States. The United States Census Bureau estimate the city has a population of 4 in 2019.

Geography
San Fernando is located at  (26.403308, -98.835072).

Education
It is in the Rio Grande City Grulla Independent School District (formerly Rio Grande City Consolidated Independent School District)

References

Census-designated places in Starr County, Texas
Census-designated places in Texas